In 2013 there were two major sets of cyberattacks on South Korean targets attributed to elements within North Korea.

March
On 20 March 2013, three South Korean television stations and a bank suffered from frozen computer terminals in a suspected act of cyberwarfare. ATMs and mobile payments were also affected. The South Korean communications watchdog Korea Communications Commission raised their alert level on cyber-attacks to three on a scale of five. North Korea has been blamed for similar attacks in 2009 and 2011 and was suspected of launching this attack as well. This attack also came at a period of elevated tensions between the two Koreas, following Pyongyang’s nuclear test on 12 February. South Korean officials linked the incident to a Chinese IP address, which increased suspicion of North Korea as "[i]ntelligence experts believe that North Korea routinely uses Chinese computer addresses to hide its cyber-attacks."

The attacks on all six organizations derived from one single entity. The networks were attacked by malicious codes, rather than distributed denial-of-service (DDoS) attacks as suspected at the beginning. It appeared to have used only hard drive overwrites. This cyberattack “damaged 32,000 computers and servers of media and financial companies.” The Financial Services Commission of South Korea said that Shinhan Bank reported that its Internet banking servers had been temporarily blocked and that  and NongHyup reported that operations at some of their branches had been paralyzed after computers were infected with viruses and their files erased. Woori Bank reported a hacking attack, but said it had suffered no damage. Computer shutdowns also hit companies including the Korean Broadcasting System, Munhwa Broadcasting Corporation, and YTN.

This cyberattack “caused US$750 million in economic damage alone. (Feakin 2013)” Also, “[t]he frequency of cyber attacks by North Korea and rampant cyber espionage activities attributed to China are of great concern to the South Korean government. (Lewis 2013)”

June
The June 25 cyber terror is an information leak that occurred on June 25, 2013 that targeted Cheongwadae and other institutions. The hacker that caused this incident admitted that the information of 2.5 million Saenuri Party members, 300 thousand soldiers, 100 thousand Cheongwadae homepage users and 40 thousand United States Forces Korea members. There were apparent hacking attacks on government websites. The incident happened on the 63rd anniversary of the start of the 1950-53 Korean War, which was a war that divided the Korean peninsula. Since the Blue House’s website was hacked, the personal information of a total of 220,000 people, including 100,000 ordinary citizens and 20,000 military personnel, using the “Cheong Wa Dae” website were hacked. The website of the office for Government Policy Co-ordination and some media servers were affected as well. 

While multiple attacks were organized by multiple perpetrators, one of the distributed denial-of-service (DDoS) attacks against the South Korean government websites were directly linked to the “DarkSeoul” gang and Trojan.Castov. Malware related to the attack is called "DarkSeoul" in the computer world and was first identified in 2012. It has contributed to multiple previous high-profile attacks against South Korea.

Timeline
At approximately 2013 June 25 9:10 AM, websites such as the Cheongwadae website, main government institute websites, news, etc. became victims of website change, DDoS, information thievery and other such attacks. When connecting to the Cheongwadae homepage words such as 'The great Kim Jong-un governor' and 'All hail the unified chairman Kim Jong-un! Until our demands are met our attacks will continue. Greet us. We are anonymous' would appear with a photo of president Park Geun-hye.

The government changed the status of cyber danger to 'noteworthy' on June 25 10:45 AM, then changed it to 'warning' on 3:40 PM. Cheongwadae uploaded an apology on June 28.

The Ministry of Science, ICT and Future Planning revealed on July 16 that both the March and June incidents corresponded with past hacking methods used by North Korea. However, the attacked targets include a Japanese Korean Central News Agency site and major North Korean anti-South websites, and the hackers also have announced that they would release information of approximately 20 high-ranked North Korean army officers with countless pieces of information on North Korean weaponry.

Response
Following the hacking in June there was further speculation that North Korea was responsible for the attacks. Investigators found that “an IP address used in the attack matched one used in previous hacking attempts by Pyongyang.” Park Jae-moon, a former director-general at the Ministry of Science, ICT and Future Planning said, “82 malignant codes [collected from the damaged devices] and internet addresses used for the attack, as well as the North Korea's previous hacking patterns," proved that "the hacking methods were the same" as those used in the 20 March cyber attacks.

With this incident, the Korean government publicly announced that they would take charge of the “Cyber Terror Response Control Tower” and along with different ministries, the National Intelligence Service (NIS) will be responsible to build a comprehensive response system using the “National Cyber Security Measures.” 

The South Korean government asserted a Pyongyang link in the March cyberattacks, which has been denied by Pyongyang. A 50-year-old South Korean man identified as Mr. Kim is suspected to be involved in the attack.

Appearance in the South Korean National Geographic 
The South Korean National Geographic published cyber terror as one of the top 10 keywords of 2013 due to these attacks.

See also 
 Bureau 121
 Lazarus Group

References

2013 in South Korea
Cyberwarfare
2010s internet outages